William Stuart Symington IV (born 1952) served as the United States Special Envoy for South Sudan from January 2020 to February 2021. He was United States Ambassador to Nigeria from 2016 to 2019. Earlier he served tours as U.S. Ambassador to Rwanda and Djibouti, as U.S. Special Representative for the Central African Republic, and as Deputy Assistant Secretary.

Biography
Symington was U.S. Ambassador to the Federal Republic of Nigeria (2016-2019). From 2020 to 2021 he was U.S. Special Envoy for South Sudan. Previously, he was the Deputy Assistant Secretary of State for Central Africa and African Security Affairs (2015-2016), U.S. Special Representative for the Central African Republic (2014-2016 and Political Advisor to the Commander NORAD/US Northern Command 2011–2014). He also served as Ambassador to Rwanda (2008-2011), Ambassador to Djibouti 2006–2008), and Deputy Chief of Mission and Charge' d'affaires in Niger (2001-2003).  He was United States Department of State's  Representative at the Joint Forces Staff College in Norfolk, Virginia from 2005 to 2006, Political Officer at the U.S. Embassy in Baghdad, Iraq from 2004 to 2005, and Deputy Director of the Department's Office of West African Affairs from 2003 to 2005.

Earlier in his career, Symington served in Ecuador, Mexico, Spain and Honduras and as a Pearson Fellow in the Office of U.S. Congressman Ike Skelton. Before joining the Department of State he practiced law in Missouri, New York, London and Paris. 

Symington received a B.A. from Brown University and a J.D. from Columbia Law School. He and his spouse Susan Ide Symington have been married for 40 years. A member of Symington family, he is the grandson of Senator Stuart Symington.

Ambassadorships

Djibouti
He served as the U.S. Ambassador to Djibouti from 2006 to 2008.

Rwanda
He served as the U.S. Ambassador to Rwanda from 2008 to 2011.

Nigeria
Symington was sworn in as Ambassador to Nigeria on October 3, 2016 and served until August 30, 2019.

References

|-

|-

|-

1952 births
Living people
Ambassadors of the United States to Djibouti
Ambassadors of the United States to Nigeria
Ambassadors of the United States to Rwanda
Brown University alumni
Columbia Law School alumni
People from Missouri
United States Special Envoys
United States Foreign Service personnel
21st-century American diplomats